MLSA is an initialism that can refer to a number of things:

Medical Laboratory Scientists' Association, an Irish trade union
Ministry of Labour Staff Association, a former British trade union
MLSA1 and MLSA2, genes required for mycolactone biosynthesis
Multilocus sequence analysis, a molecular biology technique involving Multilocus sequence typing
Museum and Library Services Act, that established the Institute of Museum and Library Services
Mutual Logistics Support Agreement, an agreement signed in 2002 as part of Philippines–United States relations